Ricky Karanda Suwardi (born 21 January 1992) is an Indonesian badminton player specializing in doubles. He is from Mutiara Cardinal Bandung club. Paired with Angga Pratama started end of 2014, the 2015 Singapore Open became the first BWF World Superseries title for him in the men's doubles after beating Chinese pair Fu Haifeng and Zhang Nan in the final by 21–15, 11–21, 21–14.

Awards and nominations

Achievements

Southeast Asian Games 
Men's doubles

Asian Junior Championships 
Mixed doubles

BWF World Tour (1 runner-up) 
The BWF World Tour, which was announced on 19 March 2017 and implemented in 2018, is a series of elite badminton tournaments sanctioned by the Badminton World Federation (BWF). The BWF World Tour is divided into levels of World Tour Finals, Super 1000, Super 750, Super 500, Super 300, and the BWF Tour Super 100.

Men's doubles

BWF Superseries (1 title, 3 runners-up) 
The BWF Superseries, which was launched on 14 December 2006 and implemented in 2007, was a series of elite badminton tournaments, sanctioned by the Badminton World Federation (BWF). BWF Superseries levels were Superseries and Superseries Premier. A season of Superseries consisted of twelve tournaments around the world that had been introduced since 2011. Successful players were invited to the Superseries Finals, which were held at the end of each year.

Men's doubles

  BWF Superseries Finals tournament
  BWF Superseries Premier tournament
  BWF Superseries tournament

BWF Grand Prix (4 runners-up) 
The BWF Grand Prix had two levels, the Grand Prix and Grand Prix Gold. It was a series of badminton tournaments sanctioned by the Badminton World Federation (BWF) and played between 2007 and 2017.

Men's doubles

  BWF Grand Prix Gold tournament
  BWF Grand Prix tournament

BWF International Challenge/Series (2 titles, 2 runners-up) 
Men's doubles

  BWF International Challenge tournament
  BWF International Series tournament

BWF Junior International 
Boys' doubles

  BWF Junior International Grand Prix tournament
  BWF Junior International Challenge tournament
  BWF Junior International Series tournament
  BWF Junior Future Series tournament

Performance timeline

National team 
 Junior level

 Senior level

Individual competitions

Junior level
 Mixed doubles

Senior level

Men's doubles

Mixed doubles

Record against selected opponents 
Men's doubles results against World Superseries finalists, World Superseries Finals semifinalists, World Championships semifinalists, and Olympic quarterfinalists paired with:

Angga Pratama 

  Cai Yun & Lu Kai 1–1
  Chai Biao & Hong Wei 0–1
  Fu Haifeng & Zhang Nan 1–1
  Li Junhui & Liu Yuchen 1–2
  Liu Xiaolong & Qiu Zihan 1–2
  Lee Sheng-mu & Tsai Chia-hsin 1–0
  Mads Pieler Kolding & Mads Conrad-Petersen 1–1
  Mathias Boe & Carsten Mogensen 0–5
  Marcus Fernaldi Gideon & Kevin Sanjaya Sukamuljo 0–4
  Hiroyuki Endo & Kenichi Hayakawa 2–2
  Takeshi Kamura & Keigo Sonoda 5–1
  Kim Gi-jung & Kim Sa-rang 3–1
  Ko Sung-hyun & Shin Baek-cheol 1–1
  Lee Yong-dae & Yoo Yeon-seong 1–5
  Goh V Shem & Tan Wee Kiong 2–0
  Koo Kien Keat & Tan Boon Heong 0–1

Berry Angriawan 

  Cai Yun & Lu Kai 0–1
  Liu Xiaolong & Qiu Zihan 0–1
  Lee Sheng-mu & Tsai Chia-hsin 0–2
  Mads Pieler Kolding & Mads Conrad-Petersen 1–0
  Mathias Boe & Carsten Mogensen 0–1
  Angga Pratama & Rian Agung Saputro 1–0
  Hirokatsu Hashimoto & Noriyasu Hirata 1–0
  Hiroyuki Endo & Kenichi Hayakawa 2–1
  Ko Sung-hyun & Shin Baek-cheol 0–1

References

External links 
 

1992 births
Living people
People from Cirebon
Sportspeople from West Java
Indonesian male badminton players
Badminton players at the 2018 Asian Games
Asian Games silver medalists for Indonesia
Asian Games medalists in badminton
Medalists at the 2018 Asian Games
Competitors at the 2013 Southeast Asian Games
Competitors at the 2015 Southeast Asian Games
Southeast Asian Games gold medalists for Indonesia
Southeast Asian Games silver medalists for Indonesia
Southeast Asian Games medalists in badminton
21st-century Indonesian people